George Diehl Homestead is a historic home located at Cherryhill Township, Indiana County, Pennsylvania.  It was built about 1840, and is a -story, rectangular hewn log building with a gable roof.  It measures 18 feet, 6 inches, wide and 28 feet, 4 inches, long. It features mortise and tenon jointing, also known as corner-post construction, for the log structure. A 14 foot by 28 foot, 4 inch, shed-roofed addition was built about 1850.

It was added to the National Register of Historic Places in 1987.

References

Houses on the National Register of Historic Places in Pennsylvania
Houses completed in 1850
Houses in Indiana County, Pennsylvania
National Register of Historic Places in Indiana County, Pennsylvania